The Indian cricket team toured Sri Lanka from 28 January to 10 February 2009. The tour included five ODIs and one T20I. India won the ODI series 4-1 and also the T20I.

Squad

India's squad for the ODI series was announced on 18 January. It was Ravindra Jadeja's maiden call up to the national Indian squad. Praveen Kumar also returned after being dropped for the home ODI series against England. Kumar and Jadeja replaced Harbhajan Singh who was injured and Virat Kohli who was dropped in favour of the all rounder Jadeja. After the first ODI Munaf Patel sustained a groin injury and Lakshmipathy Balaji was called up to the squad after a four-year hiatus having last played for India in 2005.

Sri Lanka announced their squad for the first three ODI's on 26 January. The squad was unchanged from the one that toured Pakistan.

ODI series

1st ODI

2nd ODI

3rd ODI

4th ODI

5th ODI

T20I series

Only T20I

References

External links 
 Tour home at ESPN Cricinfo

International cricket competitions in 2008–09
Sri Lankan cricket seasons from 2000–01
2009 in Sri Lankan cricket
2008-09
2009 in Indian cricket